Count  was a Japanese statesman of the Meiji era. He was a protégé of the leading oligarch Itō Hirobumi. As cabinet secretary 1892-1898, he was a powerbroker between the oligarchy and the political powers in the Diet. He grew increasingly conservative and became a watchdog and defender of the constitution in his role as privy councillor, 1899-1934. Biographer George Akita calls him a political failure.

Biography
Itō was born into a local samurai administrator's family in Nagasaki, Hizen Province (present-day Nagasaki Prefecture). From his early days, he showed a mastery of foreign languages. In the new Meiji government he worked as a translation official for Hyōgo Prefecture specializing in English, and was later selected to accompany Itō Hirobumi (no relation—the Chinese characters for their names being different) to Europe in 1882 to investigate the constitutions and governmental structures of various European counties, with the aim of creating a constitution for Japan.

After his return to Japan, he assisted Inoue Kowashi and Kaneko Kentarō in drafting the Meiji Constitution, and was subsequently nominated to the House of Peers of the Diet of Japan.

In 1892, he became Chief Cabinet Secretary in Itō Hirobumi's second administration, and in 1898, served as Minister of Agriculture and Commerce under the third Itō administration.

At the same time, Itō Miyoji was also president of the pro-government newspaper, the Tokyo Nichinichi Shimbun (the predecessor to the modern Mainichi Shimbun).

From 1899, Itō Miyoji served as a member of the Privy Council. In 1907, he was ennobled with the title of danshaku (baron) under the kazoku peerage system. He was further elevated to hakushaku (count) in 1922.

In his later years, Itō was the bane of civilian government through his consistent and conservative use of the Tokyo Nichinichi Shimbun to inflame public opinion. During the Shōwa financial crisis, he brought out the collapse of the administration of Prime Minister Wakatsuki Reijirō through a virulent bad-press campaign. He also strongly criticized Prime Minister Hamaguchi Osachi for signing the London Naval Treaty on arms limitations as infringing on the direct prerogatives of the emperor.

Itō died in 1934. His grave is at Tsukiji Hongan-ji in Tokyo.

References and further reading
 Akita, George. "The Other Itō: A Political Failure." in Albert Craig, ed. Personality in Japanese History (1970): 335-72.
Gordon, Andrew. A Modern History of Japan: From Tokugawa Times to the Present. Oxford University Press, 2003. 
Sims, Richard. Japanese Political History Since the Meiji Renovation 1868-2000. Palgrave Macmillan, 2001.

References

External links
National Diet Library Photo & Bio

1857 births
1934 deaths
Politicians from Nagasaki Prefecture
Kazoku
People of Meiji-period Japan
Members of the House of Peers (Japan)
Government ministers of Japan